Artur Gajek (born 18 April 1985 in Bergisch Gladbach, North Rhine-Westphalia) is a former German road bicycle racer who last rode for .

Major results
2006
 1st Rund um den Sachsenring
 1st Omloop van het Houtland
 1st Stage 1, Vuelta a Tenerife

External links 

1985 births
Living people
People from Bergisch Gladbach
Sportspeople from Cologne (region)
German male cyclists
Cyclists from North Rhine-Westphalia